Sigurd Lunde (27 April 1916–21 January 2006) was a Norwegian theologian, teacher, author, broadcaster, and Bishop of the Diocese of Stavanger.  Lunde also wrote music and lyrics to hymns and psalms. He was the father of news anchor Einar Lunde.

Biography
Sigurd Lunde was born on 27 April 1916.  After going to school and being ordained as a priest in the Church of Norway, he also studied journalism in the United States.  In 1942, he was hired by the Norwegian Missionary Society.  He edited Norsk misjonstidende journal starting in 1946.  From 1952 until 1966, Lunde worked for the Norwegian Broadcasting Corporation (NRK) as part of their religious broadcasts. He started the radio program  (Hymns and songs that we love).  During his time with the NRK, he was also a teacher in the University of Oslo's practical-theological seminary from 1957 to 1967. 

In 1966 he left the radio business and he was appointed as a curate at Ullern Church.  He was promoted to vicar in the same parish in 1971.  He was the bishop of the Diocese of Stavanger from 1977 to his retirement in 1986.  He died on 21 January 2006 after a long illness.

Publications

Hymns

Books
 (1964)
 (1964)
 (1978)
 (1992)
 (1992)

References

1916 births
2006 deaths
Bishops of Stavanger
20th-century Lutheran bishops
Academic staff of the University of Oslo
NRK people